{{DISPLAYTITLE:C28H37ClO7}}
The molecular formula C28H37ClO7 (molar mass: 521.04 g/mol, exact mass: 520.2228 u) may refer to:

 Alclometasone dipropionate
 Beclometasone, or beclometasone dipropionate